A sense of impending doom is a medical symptom that consists of an intense feeling that something life threatening or tragic is about to occur, despite no apparent danger. Causes can be either psychological or physiological. Psychological causes can include an anxiety disorder, depression, panic disorder, or bipolar disorder. A sense of impending doom often precedes or accompanies a panic attack. Physiological cause could include a pheochromocytoma, heart attack, blood transfusion, or anaphylaxis. A sense of impending doom can also present itself as a postoperative complication encountered after surgery.

See also 

 Angor animi

References 

Anxiety disorders
Emotional issues
Fear